The 1949 St. Louis Cardinals season was the team's 68th season in St. Louis, Missouri, and its 58th season in the National League (NL). The Cardinals went 96–58 during the season and finished second in their league. The team set an NL record for fewest stolen bases in a season, 17, which still stands.

Offseason 
 November 24, 1948: Ray Jablonski was drafted by the Cardinals from the Boston Red Sox in the 1948 minor league draft.
 Prior to 1949 season (exact date unknown)
Dick Rand was signed as an amateur free agent by the Cardinals.
Neal Hertweck was signed as an amateur free agent by the Cardinals.

Regular season

Season standings

Record vs. opponents

Roster

Player stats

Batting

Starters by position 
Note: Pos = Position; G = Games played; AB = At bats; H = Hits; Avg. = Batting average; HR = Home runs; RBI = Runs batted in

Other batters 
Note: G = Games played; AB = At bats; H = Hits; Avg. = Batting average; HR = Home runs; RBI = Runs batted in

Pitching

Starting pitchers 
Note: G = Games pitched; IP = Innings pitched; W = Wins; L = Losses; ERA = Earned run average; SO = Strikeouts

Other pitchers 
Note: G = Games pitched; IP = Innings pitched; W = Wins; L = Losses; ERA = Earned run average; SO = Strikeouts

Relief pitchers 
Note: G = Games pitched; W = Wins; L = Losses; SV = Saves; ERA = Earned run average; SO = Strikeouts

Farm system 

LEAGUE CHAMPIONS: Lynchburg, Pocatello

References

External links 
1949 St. Louis Cardinals at Baseball Reference
1949 St. Louis Cardinals team page at www.baseball-almanac.com

 

St. Louis Cardinals seasons
Saint Louis Cardinals season
1949 in sports in Missouri